The A. P. Dickman House, also known as the Ruskin House Bed and Breakfast, is a historic home in Ruskin, Florida built in 1911. It is located at 120 Dickman Drive, Southeast.  It was added to the National Register of Historic Places in 2000.

The house combines elements of Colonial Revival and Queen Anne architecture.

The bed and breakfast business has reportedly been closed.

References

External links
 Hillsborough County listings at Florida's Office of Cultural and Historical Programs

Houses on the National Register of Historic Places in Hillsborough County, Florida
Bed and breakfasts in Florida